Hamet may refer to:

People
 Ali Hamet, Ottoman commander in the Battle of Alborán
 Barney Hamet, fictitious writer in several novels by Edward D. Hoch
 James Hamet Dunn, Canadian financier
 Jeffrey Hamet O'Neal, Irish miniature-painter
 Emmanuelle Hamet, French voice actress that voiced Ma in The Crumpets
 Mully Hamet, also known as Ahmad al-Mansur, Moroccan sultan
 Pavel Hamet, Canadian doctor and researcher

Places
 Hamet, locally spelled Ħamet, an area of Xagħra, Gozo, Malta
 Hamet Jerid, Tozeur Governorate, Tunisia